The Monumento a la Independencia is a monument in Guadalajara, in the Mexican state of Jalisco.

References

External links

 

Centro, Guadalajara
Monuments and memorials in Jalisco
Outdoor sculptures in Guadalajara
Statues in Jalisco